The twin battles of Jena and Auerstedt (older spelling: Auerstädt) were fought on 14 October 1806 on the plateau west of the river Saale in today's Germany, between the forces of Napoleon I of France and Frederick William III of Prussia. The defeat suffered by the Prussian Army subjugated the Kingdom of Prussia to the French Empire until the Sixth Coalition was formed in 1813.

Several figures who were later integral to the reformation of the Prussian Army participated at Jena–Auerstedt, including Gebhard von Blücher, Carl von Clausewitz, August Neidhardt von Gneisenau, Gerhard von Scharnhorst, and Hermann von Boyen.

Background

Following the Prussian declaration of war, Napoleon initiated his campaign against the Fourth Coalition by thrusting a 180,000-strong force through the Frankenwald. The Prussian army, meanwhile, awaited Napoleon's advance with a force composed of about 130,000 Prussians and 20,000 Saxons.

The Prussians were not organized well enough and lacked the speed as well as the efficient information flow of the French army.

Overview
The battles began when elements of Napoleon's main force encountered Hohenlohe's troops near Jena. Initially 48,000 strong, the Emperor took advantage of his carefully planned and flexible dispositions to rapidly achieve local superiority, with a force reaching 96,000 men. However, less than half fought the Prussians as only 40,000 men were sent and actually took part in the battle. The Prussians, meanwhile, were slow to grasp the situation, and slower still to react. Before Ruchel's 15,000 men could arrive from Weimar, Hohenlohe's force was routed, with 10,000 killed or wounded and 15,000 captured. Ruchel did eventually bring his troops to the battlefield. Soon after it was committed to battle and Hohenlohe rode up to take personal command of the corps. They were ridden over and sent fleeing to the rear in irretrievable rout, with Ruchel being wounded. Nevertheless, Jena was a fierce battle, with 5,000 French killed, wounded or captured; and Napoleon mistakenly believed that he had faced the main body of the Prussian army.

Further north at Auerstedt, both Davout and Bernadotte received orders to come to Napoleon's aid. Davout attempted to comply via Eckartsberga, Bernadotte via Dornburg. Davout's route south, however, was blocked by the Prussian main force of 64,000 men, including the Prussian King, the Duke of Brunswick and Field Marshals von Möllendorf and von Kalckreuth. A savage battle ensued. Although outnumbered more than two to one, Davout's superbly trained and disciplined III Corps endured repeated attacks before it eventually took the offensive and put the Prussians to flight. Though within earshot of both battles, Marshal Bernadotte controversially took no steps to come to Davout's aid, refusing to take the initiative and instead adhering to the last written set of Napoleon's orders.

Battle of Jena

Plan
The Prussian army was divided into three armies drawn from across Prussia. Prussia's main weakness in 1806 was its senior command structure, which included command positions being held by multiple officers. One such example is the position of chief of staff, held by three different officers: General Phull, Colonel Gerhard von Scharnhorst and Colonel Rudolf Massenbach. The confusing system led to delays and complexities that resulted in over a month's delay before the final order of battle was prepared. Another obstacle facing the Prussians was the creation of a unified plan of battle. Five main plans emerged for discussion; however, protracted planning and deliberating shifted the initiative to the French. Thus, the Prussian plans became mere reactions to Napoleon's movements.

Although Prussia had begun its mobilization almost a month before France, Napoleon had kept a high state of readiness after the Russian refusal to accept defeat after the War of the Third Coalition. Napoleon conceived a plan to force Prussia into a decisive battle, like Austerlitz, and pre-empt the Prussian offensive. Napoleon had a major portion of his Grande Armée in position in present-day Baden-Württemberg in southwest Germany and thus decided on a northeast advance into Saxony and on to Berlin.

Battle of Jena

The battle commenced on the morning of 14 October 1806, on the grassy fields near Jena. The first movements of the French Army were attacks on either flank of the Prussian lines. That gave the supporting armies (making up the central attack) time to get into position. The skirmishes had little decisive success, save for a breakthrough by the French General Saint-Hilaire, who attacked and isolated the Prussian left flank.

At that time, Marshal Michel Ney had completed his maneuvers and had taken up position as ordered by Napoleon. However, once in position, Ney decided to attack the Prussian line despite having no orders to do so, a move that proved to be almost disastrous. Ney's initial assault was a success, but he found himself overextended and under heavy fire from Prussian artillery. Recognizing the distressed salient, the Prussian general ordered a counterattack and enveloped Ney's forces; Ney formed them into a square to protect all their flanks. Napoleon recognized Ney's situation and ordered Marshal Jean Lannes to shift from the centre of attack to help Ney.

That action left the French centre weak. However, Napoleon deployed the Imperial Guard to hold the French center until Ney could be rescued. That adaptability was one of Napoleon's greatest strengths. He kept the Imperial Guard under his direct command and could order them to take positions depending on the situation that the battle presented him. The rescue worked, and Ney's units were able to retreat from the battle. Although the French were then in a troubling situation, the Prussian commanders did not take the initiative to push at the French weaknesses. That was later considered to have been their undoing. The inactivity of the Prussian infantry left them open to artillery and light infantry fire. One Prussian general later wrote that "the area around the entrance of the village was the scene of the most terrible blood-letting and slaughter".

It was at that time, around 1 p.m., that Napoleon decided to make the decisive move. He ordered his flanks to push hard and try to break through the Prussian flanks and encircle the main center army while the French center attempted to crush the Prussian centre. The attacks on the flanks proved to be a success. With its flanks broken, the Prussian army was forced to withdraw and Napoleon had won another battle. In total the Prussian army lost 10,000 men killed or wounded, had 15,000 prisoners of war taken as well as 150 guns.

Battle of Auerstedt

General Étienne Gudin's Division were on the move from Naumburg before 6:30 a.m. By 7 a.m. the 1st Chasseurs were stopped cold in their tracks outside of Poppel by Prussian cavalry and artillery. There was a heavy fog, which had lifted just as they approached the village. Once Davout became aware of the Prussian force, he ordered Gudin to deploy his force at Hassenhausen.

The Prussian commander on the field was Friedrich Wilhelm Carl von Schmettau. His division was actually under orders to proceed down the very road that Davout was on, to block his advance in the Kösen Pass. While Schmettau's troops were deploying to attack Hassenhausen, Blücher arrived with his cavalry and deployed on his left. Together, they attacked Gudin's troops and pushed them back to the village.

Wartensleben arrived at 8:30 a.m. with the Duke of Brunswick, who ordered his infantry to the left flank and his cavalry to the right. The rest of the French cavalry arrived at 9 a.m. and was placed on Gudin's left. General Louis Friant's Division and the 12-pound artillery arrived at 9:30 a.m. and moved in squares on Gudin's right. The advance of the French squares forced Blücher's cavalry back. Seeing no other option available he ordered his cavalry to attack. At that very moment, two of Wartensleben's regiments attacked Hassenhausen.

Everything failed: three Prussian cavalry regiments were routed and the infantry fell back. At this critical point, the Duke needed to take drastic action. Shortly before 10 a.m., he ordered a full assault on Hassenhausen. By 10 a.m., the Duke of Brunswick was carried from the field mortally wounded along with Schmettau who was also badly wounded. With the loss of both commanders, the Prussian command broke down. The Prussian army was in danger of collapse.

Oswald's infantry and the Prince of Orange, the later William I of the Netherlands, arrived about 10:30 a.m., and the King made his only decision of the day: to split Orange's command in two, half to each flank. On the French side, Morand's Division arrived and was sent to secure Gudin's left. Davout could now see that the Prussians were wavering and so at 11 a.m. he ordered his infantry to counter-attack. By noon Schmettau's center was broken and forced back over the Lissbach Stream, Blücher's cavalry was blown, and Wartensleben was trying to reposition his troops. The Prussians realized all was now lost and the King ordered a withdrawal.

Davout's corps had lost 7,052 officers and men killed or wounded, while Prussian casualties were 13,000.

Aftermath

Napoleon initially did not believe that Davout's single Corps had defeated the Prussian main body unaided and responded to the first report by saying "Your Marshal must be seeing double!", a reference to Davout's poor eyesight. As matters became clearer, however, the Emperor was unstinting in his praise.  Davout was made Duke of Auerstedt. Lannes, the hero of Jena, was not so honored.

Bernadotte's lack of action was controversial within a week of the twin battles. Bernadotte had last received positive written orders on the day before the battle in which his I Corps, along with Davout's III Corps, were to lie astride the Prussians' projected line of retreat. He was the only Marshal not to receive updated, written orders on the night of 13 October. In the early hours of 14 October, Davout received a courier from Berthier in which he wrote: "If the Prince of Ponte Corvo [Bernadotte] is with you, you may both march together, but the Emperor hopes that he will be in the position which had been indicated at Dornburg." Davout thence relayed this order to Bernadotte when the next met at 0400 the same morning. Bernadotte later cited the poorly written, equivocal nature of the verbal order, as discretionary and complied with Napoleon's wish to be at Dornburg instead of accompanying Davout. Moreover, when told of Davout's difficulties, Bernadotte did not believe that the Prussian main force was before III Corps as Napoleon had claimed the main body was at Jena. As a consequence, he failed to aid Davout and instead fulfilled the Emperor's orders to position I Corps in the Prussian rear on the Heights of Apolda, which, incidentally, did have the effect intended as the Prussians at Jena withdrew once they saw French troops occupy their line of retreat.

Davout and Bernadotte later became bitter enemies as the result of Bernadotte's perceived indifference at the fate of a fellow Marshal. For his part, Napoleon later stated on St. Helena that Bernadotte's behavior (though he was complying with Napoleon's orders) was disgraceful and that but for his attachment to Bernadotte's wife, Napoleon's own former fiancée, Désirée Clary, he would have had Bernadotte shot. However, contemporary evidence indicates that far from scenes of recriminations and insults alleged by Davout and his aides-de-Camp against Bernadotte the night of the battles, Napoleon was unaware anything was amiss, insofar as I Corps had played the part assigned to it by the Emperor, until days later.

A later search of the orders and dispatches from the Imperial Headquarters never yielded any order for Bernadotte to march with Davout. They did, however, confirm Berthier's order of 14 October, sending Bernadotte to Dornberg. The lack of documentation supporting Napoleon's accusation against Bernadotte calls into question whether Napoleon had intended I Corps to march with Davout, and the order was incorrectly transmitted to Bernadotte on the morning of 14 October, or if Napoleon was using the opportunity to shift blame for Davout having to fight a battle on his own as suggested by Colonel Ernst Marsh Lloyd. Napoleon later sent a severely worded reprimand to Bernadotte but took no further action.

On the Prussian side, Brunswick was mortally wounded at Auerstedt, and over the next few days, the remaining forces were unable to mount any serious resistance to Murat's ruthless cavalry pursuit. In the Capitulation of Erfurt on 16 October, a large body of Prussian troops became prisoners with hardly a shot being fired. Bernadotte crushed Eugene Frederick Henry, Duke of Württemberg's Prussian Reserve Army on the 17th in the Battle of Halle, partially redeeming himself in Napoleon's eyes. In recognition of his glorious victory at Auerstadt, Napoleon gave Davout the honor of entering Berlin first. Davout led his exhausted III Corps into Berlin in triumph on 25 October. Hohenlohe's force surrendered on 28 October after the Battle of Prenzlau, followed soon after by the Capitulation of Pasewalk. The French ran down and captured several small Prussian columns at Boldekow on 30 October, Anklam on 1 November, Wolgast on 3 November, and Wismar on 5 November.

21,000 Prussian field troops remained at large west of the Oder as November began under the command of Gebhard Blücher. French advances prevented his corps from crossing the Oder, or moving toward Stettin to seek waterborne transport to East Prussia. Bernadotte began a relentless pursuit of Blücher, with the two forces engaging in several holding actions, and was later joined by Murat and Soult in "The Pursuit of the Three Marshals." Blücher then moved west to cross into neutral Denmark but the Danes placed their army on the border with the intent of attacking any force that tried to cross it. The Prussians then violated the neutrality of the Hanseatic City of Lübeck and fortified it with the intent of joining forces with an allied Swedish contingent there on its way home, and commandeering ships in the hopes of reaching a safe harbor. However, Blücher and Winning's corps was surrounded and destroyed in what became the Battle of Lübeck on 6 and 7 November after Bernadotte's I Corps, still smarting from the Emperor's censure, stormed the fortified city gates, poured into the streets and squares breaking hasty attempts at resistance and captured Blücher's command post (and his Chief of Staff Gerhard von Scharnhorst) as Soult's troops blocked all escape routes. The Prussians lost 3000 killed and wounded. On the morning of 7 November, with all hope of escape extinguished, Blücher surrendered personally to Bernadotte and went into captivity with 9,000 other Prussian prisoners of war. The Siege of Magdeburg ended on 11 November with Ney's capture of the fortress. Isolated Prussian resistance remained, but Napoleon's primary foe was now Russia, and the Battle of Eylau and the Battle of Friedland awaited.

Martin van Creveld has stated about the effects on command:

Influence

The battle proved most influential in demonstrating the need for reforms in what was a very much feudal Prussian state and army. Important Prussian reformers like Scharnhorst, Gneisenau and Clausewitz served at the battle. Their reforms, together with civilian reforms instituted over the following years, began Prussia's transformation into a modern state, which took the forefront in expelling France from Germany and eventually assumed a leading role on the continent. The reduction of Prussia to a French vassal, and the subsequent revolt that restored national honor, formed a key component of German nationalism.

The German philosopher Georg Wilhelm Friedrich Hegel, who was then a professor at the University of Jena, is said to have completed his chef d'œuvre, the Phenomenology of Spirit, while the battle raged. Hegel considered this battle to be "the end of the history", in terms of evolution of human societies towards what would be called the "universal homogeneous state

Napoleon built a bridge in Paris which he named after the battle. When he was defeated, the Prussian contingent of the allied forces of occupation was so incensed by its name that they wished to destroy the bridge. Talleyrand temporarily renamed the bridge after the French Grand Army, which dissuaded them from doing so. The station of the Paris Metro at the bridge has the same name.

See also
 Military career of Napoleon Bonaparte

Explanatory notes

Notes

References

Further reading

External links
Napoleonic Guide
Student documentary about the battle of Jena–Auerstedt (40 minutes)

Conflicts in 1806
Battles of the Napoleonic Wars
Battles of the War of the Fourth Coalition
Battles involving France
Battles involving Prussia
Battles involving Saxony
Battles in Thuringia
1806 in Europe
October 1806 events
Battles inscribed on the Arc de Triomphe
Joachim Murat